The Falcon in San Francisco is a 1945 American crime and mystery film directed by Joseph H. Lewis and stars Tom Conway, Rita Corday and Edward Brophy, who played the recurring role of "Goldie" Locke.  The film was the 11th in The Falcon series of detective films, and the eighth featuring Conway as the amateur sleuth. The Falcon in San Francisco was the final film in the series produced by Maurice Geraghty, after which budgets were reduced and location shooting largely abandoned.

Plot

While travelling by train with his sidekick and assistant, "Goldie" Locke (Edward Brophy), for a vacation in San Francisco, Tom Lawrence (Tom Conway), a.k.a. The Falcon, meets Annie Marshall (Sharyn Moffett), a lonely little girl. Annie tells them that she is being held prisoner by her nurse, Miss Carla Keyes (Hermine Sterler), and butler Loomis (Jason Robards Sr.).  Annie's story is cut short when Miss Keyes comes for her. Shortly after, the little girl rushes back to Tom to tell him her nurse is dead.

Tom and Goldie take charge of Annie but police are notified that the little girl was kidnapped. When the train arrives in San Francisco, the police are waiting for the Falcon. Released on $10,000 bail, posted by Doreen Temple (Fay Helm), who promises Tom she will disclose the motive behind her generosity. At dinner that evening, Doreen brings along her bodyguard Rickey (Carl Kent), posing as a police officer. When they leave, Rickey knocks Tom out and takes him to Doreen's apartment where she interrogates him about the murder, and to stay away from gangster Peter Vantine (John Mylong) and the cargo ship, the S.S. Citadel.

After Tom returns to his hotel to collect Goldie, they decide to pay a visit to Annie's house, where they meet her older sister Joan (Rita Corday) who denies that she knows Doreen or Vantine. Annie claims she made up the story about being held captive, but when Tom sneaks back to the house to talk to her, she says Loomis is holding her prisoner. She takes them to Carla's room where they find a photograph of a ship's officer (Johnny Strong), signed to his wife, Carla.

Loomis hears someone rummaging around in the nurse's room, but is shot dead by an unknown assailant. Returning to their hotel, Tom is confronted by Vantine, who is brandishing a gun. When Tom disarms him, he learns Doreen was the romantic interest of an ex-bootlegger, Duke Monette (Robert Armstrong), involved with a shipment aboard the S.S. Citadel.

Tom visits the Star Coastal lines where DeForrest, the company's general manager, is meeting with Joan, the owner of the company. A clerk at the office alerts Tom to go to an address, which turns out to be Doreen's apartment, where she is waiting with her gang. Vantine, also lured into her trap, arrives and begins to fight with Doreen's thugs. Tom and Joan manage an escape but on his return to his hotel room, discovers DeForrest hiding in a closet. Goldie finds a newspaper article that shows who the real owner of the steamship S.S. Citadel is: Duke Monette.

That night Tom and Goldie sneak aboard the ship and find raw silk hidden among the bales of hemp cargo. Returning to the Marshall house, the little girl tells Tom that Joan has left to meet her "secret lover" on Telegraph Hill. Tom observes the rendezvous with Joan and DeForrest, who Tom thinks is really Duke Monette, confessing that he used a secret identity to protect his daughters, Joan and Annie.

Fearing Doreen plans to hijack the illicit silk cargo that night, Duke asks for the detective's help. At dockside, Duke and Tom watch Vantine, Doreen and the other gang members board the S.S. Citadel. Duke suddenly knocks the ship's engineer unconscious, and blows up the unattended boiler room, then pulls a gun on Doreen and Tom.

Tom tells Doreen that Duke killed Miss Keyes and Loomis, the employees she hired to watch over the girls. When Tom warns that Duke plans to blow up the ship, Doreen and Rickey lunge forward to disarm Duke, who shoots them both, but Rickey shoots Duke, allowing Tom to flee before the ship explodes.

Main cast

 Tom Conway as Tom Lawrence  
 Rita Corday as Joan Marshall  
 Edward Brophy as "Goldie" Locke  
 Sharyn Moffett as Annie Marshall  
 Fay Helm as Doreen Temple  
 Robert Armstrong as Duke Monette / DeForrest Marshall  
 Carl Kent as Rickey  
 Jason Robards Sr. as Loomis - the Butler (uncredited)
 George Holmes as Dalman 
 John Mylong as Peter Vantine / Carl Dudley
 George Holmes as Dalman
 Edmund Cobb as Police officer
 Ralph Dunn as Police officer
 Eden Nicholas as Clerk
 Joan Beckstead as Sexy girl
 Hermine Sterler as Miss Carla Keyes
 Max Rose as Taxi driver
 Dorothy Adams as Chambermaid
 Maxine Semon as Plain girl
 Mary Worth as Dowager
 Myrna Dell as Beautiful girl
 Linda Van Loon as Beautiful girl
 Johnny Strong as First mate
 Jack Gargan as Waiter
 Philip Morris as Conductor
 Sam Harris as Pullman porter
 Napoleon Whiting as Pullman porter
 Norman Mayes as Redcap
 Harry Strang as Desk sergeant
 Perc Launders as Turnkey
 Kernan Cripps as Police captain

Production
"My Shining Hour" (1943) (uncredited) and "The Sky's the Limit"(music only), music by Harold Arlen, lyrics by Johnny Mercer was played by house orchestra in the nightclub scene. Sequences in The Falcon in San Francisco were shot on location at prominent locations in San Francisco.

Reception
Film historians Richard Jewell and Vernon Harbin described The Falcon in San Francisco, as part of a programmed series. "One of the quaint conventions of the Falcon series was that whenever  Tom Conway embarked on a vacation, a corpse would pop up to interrupt his relaxation".

In a recent review of the Falcon series for the Time Out Film Guide, Tom Milne wrote, "Conway, bringing a lighter touch to the series (which managed its comic relief better than most), starred in nine films after The Falcon's Brother, most of them deft and surprisingly enjoyable." After its release into home video, The Falcon in San Francisco was reviewed in DVD Active.com, "The plot gets thicker than Northern gravy with boiled potatoes when more bodies hit the sawdust, and links to a shipping magnate are uncovered - all linked to a man with no past and a gangster thought to be long dead. Will The Falcon unravel this mystery without taking a bullet? Will the mafia have their plan thwarted? Can Goldie find himself a bride to reduce his level of income tax?"

References

Notes

Citations

Bibliography

 Jewell, Richard and Vernon Harbin. The RKO Story. New Rochelle, New York: Arlington House, 1982. .
 Pym, John, ed. Time Out Film Guide. London: Time Out Guides Limited, 2004. .

External links
 
 
 
 
 Review of film at Variety

1945 films
1945 crime films
American mystery films
American black-and-white films
1945 mystery films
1940s English-language films
RKO Pictures films
Films set in San Francisco
Films shot in San Francisco
Films directed by Joseph H. Lewis
Films scored by Paul Sawtell
The Falcon (film character) films
1940s American films